The national symbols of Egypt are official and unofficial flags, icons or cultural expressions that are emblematic, representative or otherwise characteristic of Egypt and of its culture.

Symbol

References 

National symbols of Egypt